Club Deportivo Dénia is a Spanish football team based in Dénia, in the autonomous community of Valencia. Founded in 1927 it plays in Divisiones Regionales de Fútbol in the Valencian Community, holding home games at Estadio Diego Mena Cuesta, with a capacity of 3.050 seats.

History
In the 2007–08 season, celebrating its 80th birthday, Dénia made its debuts in the third division, ranking in a comfortable 12th place. On 1 July 2012, even though the club finished 15th, outside of the relegation zone, it was relegated to the fourth level by the Royal Spanish Football Federation for failing to pay the €200,000 deposit which was needed to compete in the former category.

Season to season

5 seasons in Segunda División B
17 seasons in Tercera División

Famous players
 Juande Ramos

References

External links
Official website 
Futbolme team profile 

Football clubs in the Valencian Community
Association football clubs established in 1927
1927 establishments in Spain